TVB-Europe or TVB Europe and various styles of the same may refer to:

TVBEurope – a broadcasting industry trade magazine owned by NewBay Media
TVB-Europe (broadcaster) – European subsidiary of Hong Kong broadcaster TVB